Tecdesk is a designer and manufacturer of SIM operated deskphones. Founded in 2008 with headquarters in London, United Kingdom, Tecdesk is part of the Santok Group that includes STK (mobile accessories), Tecmobile (mobile handsets) and thumbsUP! (gifts and gadgets). As of 2014 it has 200 employees.

Tecdesk operates in the UK, European, U.S and Mexican markets and introduced the first Android-powered SIM operated deskphone, the Tecdesk 5500i in February 2013. The phone offers HD voice call quality, Wi-Fi hotspot functionality allowing eight devices to connect to a private WLAN, Wi-Fi back up connection should the 3G / GSM network get interrupted, support for Android apps, a built-in camera for video conference calling, phonebook capacity for 6000 entries and a colour capacitive touchscreen.

The company currently supplies SIM operated deskphones for the Vodafone OneNet and BT One Phone single-hosted business services in the UK.
All Tecdesk products have been tested and conform to the Global Certification Forum standard. This endorsement ensures its phones fully operate on all global mobile networks.

References

Unified communications